Świątniki may refer to the following places in Poland:
Świątniki, Trzebnica County in Lower Silesian Voivodeship (south-west Poland)
Świątniki, Wrocław County in Lower Silesian Voivodeship (south-west Poland)
Świątniki, Radziejów County in Kuyavian-Pomeranian Voivodeship (north-central Poland)
Świątniki, Włocławek County in Kuyavian-Pomeranian Voivodeship (north-central Poland)
Świątniki, Pabianice County in Łódź Voivodeship (central Poland)
Świątniki, Piotrków County in Łódź Voivodeship (central Poland)
Świątniki, Jędrzejów County in Świętokrzyskie Voivodeship (south-central Poland)
Świątniki, Sandomierz County in Świętokrzyskie Voivodeship (south-central Poland)
Świątniki, Konin County in Greater Poland Voivodeship (west-central Poland)
Świątniki, Poznań County in Greater Poland Voivodeship (west-central Poland)